Cychropsis lucifer is a species of ground beetle in the subfamily of Carabinae. It was described by Cavazzuti in 1996.

References

lucifer
Beetles described in 1996